Zahid Ahmad (born 23 January 2003) is an Afghan cricketer. He made his first-class debut for Kunar Province in the 2018–19 Mirwais Nika Provincial 3-Day tournament on 7 March 2019.

References

External links
 

2003 births
Living people
Afghan cricketers
Place of birth missing (living people)